General Sir Thomas Bradford  (1 December 1777 – 28 November 1853) was a British Army officer.

Military career
Bradford was commissioned as an ensign in the 4th (The King's Own) Regiment of Foot in October 1793 without purchase He took part in the suppression of the Irish Rebellion of 1798, the Buenos Aires Expedition of 1806 as well as the battle of Vimeiro in 1808, battle of Corunna in 1809 and battle of Salamanca in 1812 during the Peninsular War. He commanded a Portuguese division at the Battle of Vitoria, the Battle of San Sebastian and the Battle of the Nive, all in 1813. For his service in the Peninsular he was awarded the Gold Medal with one clasp.

He became general officer commanding the 7th Division of the Army of Occupation in France in 1815, Commander-in-Chief, Scotland in 1819 and Commander-in-Chief of the Bombay Army from 1825 to 1829. He was promoted to full general on 23 November 1841.

He was then colonel of the 94th Regiment of Foot (1823–29) and, after returning to England, colonel of the 30th Regiment of Foot (1829–46).

He exchanged the colonelcy of the 38th Foot for that of the 4th (The King's Own) Regiment of Foot in 1846, a position he held until his death in 1853.

Family
He married Mary, the daughter of James Atkinson of Newcastle. His eldest son, James Henry Hollis Bradford, later changed his surname to Atkinson in compliance with the will of one Ralph Atkinson. His brother, Lieutenant-colonel Sir Henry Hollis Bradford, was also a distinguished soldier wounded at Waterloo.

References

Sources

 

|-
 

|-

|-
 

|-
 

1777 births
1853 deaths
People from Doncaster
British Army generals
British Army personnel of the Napoleonic Wars
Knights Grand Cross of the Order of the Bath
People of the Irish Rebellion of 1798